Mário G. Silveirinha is a professor of electrical engineering at Instituto Superior Técnico - University of Lisbon, and a senior researcher at Instituto de Telecomunicações, in Portugal.

He was named Fellow of the Institute of Electrical and Electronics Engineers (IEEE) in 2015 for contributions to electrodynamics of metamaterials. He was chosen as the 2018 recipient of the IET Harvey Engineering Research Prize for his outstanding contributions to research in the field of Radar and Microwave Engineering, specifically in the electrodynamics of metamaterials and its applications to microwave components and devices. In 2020, his research achievements earned him a Fellowship from The Optical Society (OSA) and the American Physical Society (APS), for pioneering and seminal contributions to the theory of metamaterials and plasmonics.

Mário Silveirinha has co-authored over 170 journal articles, 5 book chapters, and co-edited two journal special issues.

References 

Academic staff of the University of Lisbon
Fellow Members of the IEEE
Living people
Portuguese engineers
Year of birth missing (living people)